Mount Morden Long is a mountain located in the Athabasca River Valley of Jasper National Park in Alberta, Canada.

The mountain was named in 1966 after Mordon Long, who was a respected Canadian historian and chairman of the Geographic Board of Alberta.

References

Three-thousanders of Alberta
Winston Churchill Range
Mountains of Jasper National Park